The E. C. Smith House (also known as the James Hall House) is a historic home in Ocala, Florida. It is located at 507 Northeast 8th Avenue. On May 24, 1990, it was added to the U.S. National Register of Historic Places.

References

External links
 Marion County listings at National Register of Historic Places
 Marion County listings at Florida's Office of Cultural and Historical Programs

Houses on the National Register of Historic Places in Florida
Buildings and structures in Ocala, Florida
National Register of Historic Places in Marion County, Florida
Houses in Marion County, Florida